Matthew Carragher (14 January 1976 – 28 December 2016) was an English footballer who played 362 league games over twelve years in the Football League. He was a versatile defender, and was described as "a natural leader".

He began his career with Wigan Athletic in 1993, and made 119 league appearances in four years at the club, helping the "Latics" to the Third Division title in 1996–97. He then switched to Port Vale, and was later made club captain, and led the "Valiants" to victory in the Football League Trophy in 2001. Despite 194 games for the club, he was released in May 2003. Following a brief spell at Stafford Rangers, he spent two years with Macclesfield Town, before retiring in 2005.

Career
Carragher started his career at Wigan Athletic after coming through the ranks at the Latics School of Excellence, and made his debut in a 6–3 win over Chester City in October 1993. Kenny Swain's "Latics" then finished the 1993–94 campaign fourth from bottom of the Third Division. New boss Graham Barrow then led the Springfield Park club to 14th in 1994–95, before he was replaced by John Deehan. Wigan finished 10th in 1995–96, two points behind Colchester United in the play-off zone. Carragher made 16 appearances in 1996–97, as Wigan were crowned of the Third Division, finishing above Fulham on goal difference.

He moved on to Port Vale in 1997, after John Rudge judged Carragher to be a potential replacement for the ageing Dean Glover and Neil Aspin. He made 25 First Division appearances in 1997–98, helping the "Valiants" to beat Huddersfield Town 4–0 on the final day of the season to avoid relegation by one point, at the expense of Manchester City and Potteries derby rivals Stoke City. However, he featured just 12 times in 1998–99, and was not selected once by new boss Brian Horton. He scored his first goal at Vale Park on 25 September 1999, in a 2–0 win over Swindon Town, and went on to play 39 games as Vale were relegated into the Second Division at the end of the 1999–2000 season. He played 56 of the club's 57 games in 2000–01, playing in a defence of Michael Walsh, Sagi Burton, Allen Tankard, and goalkeeper Mark Goodlad. He also captained the "Valiants" at the Football League Trophy final at the Millennium Stadium, which finished as a 2–1 win over Brentford. He continued to lead the back line in 2001–02, making 47 appearances. He scored only his second goal for the club on 22 October 2002, in a 3–1 home win over Hull City in the Football League Trophy. Despite making 40 appearances in 2002–03, being one of only three settled defenders (the others being Sam Collins and Ian Brightwell), he was surprisingly released by Horton in May 2003.

Following his release from Vale he joined Stafford Rangers on non-contract terms, playing eight Southern League games, whilst Burton Albion boss Nigel Clough considered whether or not to make him an offer. Instead he signed for Macclesfield Town in November 2003. He played 18 games in 2003–04, as the "Silkmen" avoided relegation into the Conference by three places and seven points. Ironically, manager John Askey was replaced by Brian Horton in April 2004. He played 39 games in 2004–05, and featured in the play-off semi-final defeat to Lincoln City, but Horton released him from his contract at Moss Rose in May 2005.

Style of play
Carragher was a versatile defender who could play as a left-back, right-back or sweeper. He was described as "a natural leader".

Personal life and death
His father was a semi-professional footballer. He had three older sisters. Carragher married childhood sweetheart Louise Morgan in 2001. Carragher died of cancer on 29 December 2016 at the age of 40. Former teammate Tony Naylor paid tribute to him as a "a cheeky chappie, a typical Scouse lad, confident and a nice guy with it".

Career statistics
Source:

Honours
Wigan Athletic
Football League Third Division: 1996–97

Port Vale
Football League Trophy: 2001

References

1976 births
2016 deaths
Footballers from Liverpool
English footballers
Association football defenders
Wigan Athletic F.C. players
Port Vale F.C. players
Stafford Rangers F.C. players
Macclesfield Town F.C. players
English Football League players
Southern Football League players
Deaths from cancer in England